Thomas Foster may refer to:

Politics
 Thomas Foster (MP died 1589), MP for Much Wenlock
 Thomas Foster (1720–1765) (1720–1765), MP for Dorchester
 Thomas Flournoy Foster (1790–1848), American congressman from the state of Georgia
 Thomas Jefferson Foster (1809–1887), Confederate soldier and politician during the American Civil War
 Thomas Foster (Canadian politician) (1852–1945), Canadian politician and mayor of Toronto
 Thomas Foster (Los Angeles), physician and mayor of Los Angeles

Sports
 Thomas Foster (Derbyshire cricketer) (1848–1929), Derbyshire cricketer
 Thomas Foster (Australian cricketer) (1883–1974), Australian cricketer
 Thomas Foster (Yorkshire cricketer) (1871–1947), Yorkshire cricketer
 Thomas Foster (Nottingham cricketer), Nottingham cricketer

Other
 Thomas Foster (painter) (1798–1826), Irish portrait painter
 Thomas Foster (author) (died 1995), Australian Pentecostal minister and author
Thomas R. Foster, founder of the Inter-Island Steam Navigation Company
 Thomas C. Foster, American author of How to Read Literature Like a Professor

See also 
Thomas Forster (disambiguation)
Tom Foster, fictional comic book character
 Tom Foster, a character in the 1908 film After Many Years